The following is a list of the all-time leading NCAA Division I-A college football teams (in the United States) ranked by the number of consecutive games in which they scored.

During the 2021 season, Texas Tech lost 0–23 to Oklahoma State  to end their streak at 302.

During the 2022 season, Oklahoma lost 0-49 to Texas  to end their streak at 311.

Division I – Football Bowl Subdivision
These are the rankings for the Football Bowl Subdivision (FBS) through the end of 2021 season as recognized by the NCAA.

† Active streak as of the conclusion of 2021 season

^ Does not include games later vacated by NCAA action

Division I – Football Championship Subdivision
These are the rankings for the Football Championship Subdivision (FCS) through the end of 2021 season as recognized by the NCAA.

† Active streak as of conclusion of 2021 season.

‡ While Dayton holds a streak of 497 consecutive games without being shut out, 194 of these were when Dayton competed as a Division III program.

^ Before the FCS was formed in 1978.

Division II and III
The Valdosta State Blazers has the D-II record through the end of the 2021 season with 353 games with a score since September 21, 1991.

The Mount Union Purple Raiders has the D-III record through the end of the 2021 season with 519 games with a score since November 7, 1981.

Discrepancies with Official NCAA Rulebook

The East Carolina Pirates claim an  active streak of 299 games scoring as of the end of the 2021 season but is not listed on the official NCAA records. This would place their streak at 11 on the all-time list.

References

Games scoring
NCAA football games scoring